WCVQ (107.9 FM, "Q108") is a Fort Campbell, Kentucky-licensed radio station broadcasting a hot adult contemporary format in the Clarksville-Hopkinsville broadcast area.  The station is currently owned by the Five Star Media Group subsidiary of Saga Communications under licensee Saga Communications of Tuckessee, LLC. and is also broadcasting on HD radio.

WCVQ studios and offices are co-located with its sister stations in Clarksville, Montgomery County, Tennessee; all of which make up a cluster known as the 5 Star Radio Group, a unit of Saga Communications, Inc.

History 
The station first signed on the air in 1968 as WABD-FM, which at the time was a sister station to the AM station with the same call letters. WABD, now WQEZ, was a Top 40-formatted station. In the late 1970s WABD-FM broadcast an album rock format, while WABD-AM switched to oldies.

On December 13, 1986, the station was sold to Southern Broadcasting, and changed their call letters to the current WCVQ. The station has used the Q-108 branding ever since. Also in December 1986, WCVQ upgraded its signal to a 100,000 watt signal. Its current owner, Saga Communications, purchased the station at some point in the early 2000s. The station's signal has been transmitting from their present  tower ever since.

In 2014, through its HD radio signal, the station launched its HD2 subchannel to serve as a Contemporary Christian station, branded as "Sunny 99.1," which is simulcast over analog low-powered FM translator W256CI, which broadcasts at 99.1 megahertz. The next year, an HD3 subchannel was launched to bring the Classic Country format to the area, which is simulcast over W264CK, at 100.7 megahertz.

Programming
Gretchen Cordy, a Clarksville native who starred in Survivor: Borneo, hosts the station's morning show along with Ryan Ploeckelman. The show is called Ryan and Gretchen. Scott Chase is the afternoon drive personality. Chase was formerly the program director of the former WSSR "Star 95.7" in Tampa, Florida. Until 2014, the station played Kid Kelly's Backtrax USA on Sunday nights from 8 p.m. to Midnight. The station aired both the 1980s and 90s versions until WRND-FM took over both versions of the show when they changed formats in December 2013.

HD radio
The station's HD radio signal is multiplexed in this manner.

Translators

Signal coverage 
WCVQ's primary coverage area is the Clarksville/Hopkinsville metropolitan area, covering the Pennyrile region of Western Kentucky and northwestern Middle Tennessee. WCVQ also secondarily covers the Nashville Metropolitan Area as it is considered to be in both the Clarksville and Nashville radio markets. The station's signal also covers parts of the Jackson Purchase region of far western Kentucky, including Paducah, and it can also received as far as extreme southern Illinois.

WCVQ's signal also had presence in the Bowling Green area. This ended in early 2017, when that area's Fox Sports Radio affiliated station turned Oldies station WBGN launched a low-powered translator, W300DA, to rebroadcast that station's AM signal over 107.9 MHz. WCVQ could still be heard in portions of Logan and Butler counties in southern Kentucky that can not receive the FM signal of W300DA, but the signals of both stations are subject to interference with one another.

References

External links

CVQ
Hot adult contemporary radio stations in the United States
Radio stations established in 1969